The 1959 Colgate Red Raiders football team was an American football team that represented Colgate University as an independent during the 1959 NCAA University Division football season. After the resignation of Fred Rice, the university hired Alva Kelley away from Brown University to be Colgate's new head coach. Kelley led the team to a 2–7 record is his first season. Joseph Wignot was the team captain. 

The team played its home games at Colgate Athletic Field in Hamilton, New York.

Schedule

Leading players 
Statistical leaders for the 1959 Red Raiders included: 
 Rushing: John Maloney, 336 yards and 1 touchdown on 60 attempts
 Passing: Robert Paske, 567 yards, 39 completions and 5 touchdowns on 87 attempts
 Receiving: Jacque MacKinnon, 264 yards and 4 touchdowns on 15 receptions
 Total offense: Robert Paske, 568 yards (567 passing, 1 rushing)
 Scoring: Jacque MacKinnon, 38 points from 6 touchdowns and 1 two-point conversion
 All-purpose yards: Jacque MacKinnon, 960 yards (357 rushing, 264 receiving, 210 punt returning, 76 kickoff returning, 53 interception returning)

References

Colgate
Colgate Raiders football seasons
Colgate Red Raiders football